The women's 1500 metres event at the 2016 Summer Olympics took place between 12–16 August at the Olympic Stadium.

Summary
Genzebe Dibaba, the world record holder and the 2015 World Champion had an injury affected outdoor season, though she was still the fourth fastest entrant. Faith Kipyegon, the 2015 World runner-up, was the form athlete before the Olympics, being unbeaten and owning the two fastest times for the season – a Kenyan record of 3:56.41 minutes. Laura Muir's British record placed her second on the seasonal rankings. Other top entrants included Ethiopians Dawit Seyaum and Besu Sado, Dutch athlete Sifan Hassan, and American former world medallists Jennifer Simpson, Brenda Martinez and Shannon Rowbury. The 2012 Olympic champion Aslı Çakır Alptekin was absent due to a doping ban, as were five other finalists from 2012, a race ESPN "one of the dirtiest races in Olympic history."

There were no surprise eliminations in the first round. Dawit Seyaum won the fastest heat in 4:05.33 minutes, with Kipyegon and Genzebe Dibaba being the other heat winners.

Many of these women were in the World Championship race and the world record run before it.  They had a year to think about and prepare their way to beat Dibaba.  The final started off in a walk for these athletes, the first lap in 1:16.57.  Dibaba went almost to the back of the pack, with the last chaser in her previous major races, Sifan Hassan watching her back and only Laura Muir trailing.  Shannon Rowbury was relegated to the unwanted leader duties until Laura Weightman moved forward near the end of the lap.  After the slow first lap, even Muir tired of jogging at the back and moved forward, but not Dibaba and Hassan.  By the steeplechase pit, 550 metres into the race, Dibaba ran a few quicker steps and moved to the outside, foretelling her move.  Over the next 150 metres, Dibaba floated forward with ease, Hassan following.  Over the next 100 metres, Dibaba cruised to the front, with each of the key figures in the race recognizing she had passed and scrambling to follow.  With a lap and a half to go, Muir was tight on Dibaba's shoulder, followed by Faith Kipyegon, Besu Sado, Jennifer Simpson, Hassan and Rowbury.  Dawit Seyaum came up from behind to join the mix of leaders but all were fighting not to let Dibaba get away.  At the bell, Kipyegon had gotten around Muir and was right on Dibaba's back, a gap had separated between Muir and the next chaser, Hassan.  The third lap was run in 56.80.  Both Dibaba and Kipyegon appeared to be in full sprint, but Kipyegon stuck to Dibaba like glue down the backstretch.  Then with just over 200 to go, Kipyegon accelerated around Dibaba.  Dibaba had no answer.  Kipyegon continued to extend her lead on to the finish line.  Behind them was the battle for bronze.  With 150 to go, Hassan caught Muir but Simpson was right on her back and Rowbury was gaining from behind.  Coming off the turn, Simpson went into her sprint, which left Hassan behind.  Rowbury also ran past Hassan and followed Simpson to the line.  Dibaba tied up badly going in to the finish, with Simpson rapidly gaining, but the finish line arrived for Dibaba faster than a sprinting Simpson could get there.

Kipyegon ran her last 800 in 1:57.2, even faster than Dibaba ran her last 800 in Beijing.

The following evening the medals were presented by Dagmawit Girmay Berhane, IOC member, Ethiopia and Nawal El Moutawakel, Council Member of the IAAF.

Records
Prior to this competition, the existing world and Olympic records were as follows.

The following national record was established during the competition:

Schedule
All times are Brasilia Time (UTC-3)

Results

Heats

Qualification rule: first 6 in each heat (Q) and the next 6 fastest times (q) qualified.

Heat 1

Heat 2

Heat 3

Semifinals

Semifinals 1

Semifinals 2

Final

References

women's 1500 metres
2016
2016 in women's athletics
Women's events at the 2016 Summer Olympics